Marcelino Gavilán y Ponce de León (4 June 1909 – 9 March 1999) was a Spanish horse rider  who competed in the 1948 Summer Olympics and in the 1952 Summer Olympics.

In 1948 he and his horse Forajido won the silver medal as part of the Spain jumping team in the team jumping competition, after finishing 16th in the individual jumping competition.

Four years later he and his horse Quoniam finished tenth as part of the Spanish team in the team jumping event, after finishing 30th in the individual jumping.

References

External links
Marcellino Gavilán's profile at databaseOlympics
Marcellino Gavilán's profile at Sports Reference.com
Marcellino Gavilán's obituary 

1909 births
1999 deaths
Spanish male equestrians
Spanish show jumping riders
Olympic equestrians of Spain
Equestrians at the 1948 Summer Olympics
Equestrians at the 1952 Summer Olympics
Olympic silver medalists for Spain
Olympic medalists in equestrian
Medalists at the 1948 Summer Olympics
20th-century Spanish people